A pilchard, or sardine, is a small, oily fish related to the herring family, Clupeidae

Pilchard may also refer to:
 European pilchard, Sardina pilchardus, true sardine

 HMS Pilchard, a Royal Navy Ballahoo-class schooner
 Pilchard the Cat, a paradoxically-named character in the Bob the Builder television series
 South American pilchard, Sardinops sagax, aka Pacific sardine, California sardine, Chilean sardine, South African sardine
Yellow-eye mullet, Aldrichetta forsteri

Persons with the surname Pilchard
 The Venerable Thomas Pilchard (1557–1587), an English Roman Catholic priest and martyr.

See also
 Pilcher
 Sardine (disambiguation)